Väinö Ikonen (5 October 1895 – 10 February 1954) was a Finnish wrestler. He was born in Tuusniemi. He won an Olympic bronze medal in Greco-Roman wrestling in 1924. He won a gold medal at the 1921 World Wrestling Championships.

References

External links
 

1895 births
1954 deaths
People from Tuusniemi
People from Kuopio Province (Grand Duchy of Finland)
Olympic wrestlers of Finland
Wrestlers at the 1924 Summer Olympics
Finnish male sport wrestlers
Olympic bronze medalists for Finland
Olympic medalists in wrestling
Medalists at the 1924 Summer Olympics
Sportspeople from North Savo
19th-century Finnish people
20th-century Finnish people